Robert Quigg  (28 February 1885 – 14 May 1955) was an Irish recipient of the Victoria Cross, the highest and most prestigious award for gallantry in the face of the enemy that can be awarded to British and Commonwealth forces. The award was made for his actions during the Battle of the Somme in the First World War.

Early life
Robert Quigg was born on 28 February 1885 in Ardihannon, near Bushmills in County Antrim, Ireland, one of six children of Robert Quigg and his wife Matilda . His father worked as a boatman and tour guide at the nearby Giant's Causeway. Educated at the Giant's Causeway National School, Quigg worked on the Macnaghten estate at Dunderave. He was a member of the Ulster Volunteer Force and commanded the Bushmills Volunteers in 1913.

First World War
Shortly after the outbreak of the First World War, members of the Ulster Volunteer Force were urged to join the British Army to form an infantry division. Quigg enlisted in the Royal Irish Rifles (Mid-Antrim Volunteers) and was posted to its 12th Battalion as a private. His platoon officer was Sir Edward Harry Macnaghten, of the Macnaghten estate. The regiment was to form part of the 36th (Ulster) Division, which departed for the Western Front in October 1915.

The 36th Division was stationed near Thiepval Wood from March 1916 and would be involved in the upcoming Battle of the Somme, for which it was tasked with advancing to Grandcourt. On 1 July, the opening day of the Battle of the Somme, Quigg's unit, starting from the village of Hamel, located on the north bank of the River Ancre, advanced through towards the German lines. As it did so, the Irish soldiers encountered severe machine-gun and shell fire from the Germans. Quigg's platoon had to retreat on three occasions, beaten back by German fire. The final assault in the evening of 1 July left numerous soldiers of the 12th Battalion dead or wounded in "no man's land". When he became aware the next morning that Macnaughten, his platoon commander, was missing, Quigg volunteered to go out and to try to locate him. He made seven trips into "no man's land", bringing back wounded soldiers each time. However, he was unable to locate Macnaghten, whose body was never recovered. Macnaghten is commemorated on the Thiepval Memorial.

For his actions, Quigg was recommended for the Victoria Cross (VC). The VC, instituted in 1856, was the highest award for valour that could be bestowed on a soldier of the British Empire. The citation, published in the London Gazette read:

Quigg was presented with his VC by King George V at York Cottage, in Sandringham. When he returned to Bushmills after the VC investiture, there was a large turn out to welcome him home. Lady Macnaghten presented Quigg with a gold watch in recognition of his bravery in attempting to find and rescue her son. Quigg, who was also awarded the Russian Medal of the Order of St. George (Fourth Class), returned to active duty and went on to serve in Mesopotamia and Egypt, ending the war as a sergeant.

Later life

He remained in the British Army after the war but as a result of injuries from a bad fall from a window in a soldier's home in Belfast, retired from the army in 1926. He was then employed as a civilian at the Royal Ulster Rifles Depot in Armagh before, in 1934, starting work as a tour guide on the Giant's Causeway. In 1953, he met the newly crowned Queen Elizabeth II when she visited Ulster. He died on 14 May 1955 in Ballycastle. A lifelong member of the Church of Ireland, he was buried in Billy Parish Churchyard, with full military honours. He never married and was survived by his five siblings.

Medals and legacy
Quigg's medals which, along with the VC and Order of St. George, also included the 1914–15 Star, the British War Medal, Victory Medal, General Service Medal, King George V Silver Jubilee Medal, George VI Coronation Medal and Queen Elizabeth II Coronation Medal are on display at the Royal Ulster Rifles Museum in the Cathedral Quarter, Belfast. There are several memorials to him; his name is one of those listed on the memorial stone at the Thiepval Memorial for the VC recipients of the Ulster Division and he is also listed on the memorial tablet for the Royal Irish Rifles at St. Anne's Cathedral at Belfast. A stone tablet dedicated to his memory sits at the foot of the Bushmills War Memorial. In late June 2016, Queen Elizabeth II, who remembered meeting Quigg in 1953, unveiled a statue of him in Bushmills. Shortly afterwards, a Ulster History Circle blue plaque naming Quigg was applied to the school building that he attended as a boy.

Notes

References
 
 
 

Irish Battle of the Somme recipients of the Victoria Cross
Royal Ulster Rifles soldiers
British Army personnel of World War I
People from County Antrim
Military personnel from County Antrim
1885 births
1955 deaths
Ulster Volunteers
Recipients of the Cross of St. George
British Army recipients of the Victoria Cross
Irish World War I recipients of the Victoria Cross